Maurizio Malvestiti (born 25 August 1953) is the bishop of the Roman Catholic Diocese of Lodi, appointed on 26 August 2014, to replace Giuseppe Merisi.

Biography 

Born in the village of Marne, frazione of Filago in 1953, Malvestiti was baptized in the saint Bartholmew parish church. He studied at the seminary of Bergamo and was ordained as a priest in 1977. He continued his theological studies in Rome and also perfected his knowledge of French and English.

From 1978 to 1994 he taught at the seminary of Bergamo. From 1994 to 2009 he was an official at the Congregation for the Oriental Churches. On 19 June 2009 he became the under-secretary of the congregation, becoming the private secretary of the three prefects, cardinals Achille Silvestrini, Ignace Moussa I Daoud and Leonardo Sandri.

On 26 August 2014 Pope Francis appointed him as the new Bishop of Lodi; He was consecrated on 11 October 2014 by Cardinal Leonardo Sandri in St. Peter's Basilica and installed in Lodi on October 26 following, welcome and proclaimed bishop from cardinal Angelo Scola. The solemn liturgy is celebrated by quite all the priests of the diocese, the cathedral chapter, by cardinal Leonardo Sandri, and several bishops, including Giacomo Capuzzi, Nino Staffieri, Diego Coletti and Claudio Baggini.

On 4 July 2015 he appointed father Bassiano Uggè as new vicar general of the diocese.

Gallery

References

Sources 
 Official website of the Diocese of Lodi 

1953 births
Living people
Clergy from the Province of Bergamo
Bishops of Lodi
20th-century Italian Roman Catholic bishops
21st-century Italian Roman Catholic bishops